Cisów  is a village in the administrative district of Gmina Sztabin, within Augustów County, Podlaskie Voivodeship, in north-eastern Poland.

The village has a population of 80.

References

Villages in Augustów County